The Pakistan Institute of Development Economics (popularly known as PIDE) is a post-graduate research institute and a public policy think tank located in the vicinity of Islamabad, Pakistan.

Founded in 1957 by the Government of Pakistan, it is located in the university area of Quaid-e-Azam University but it has its own board of overseers. In 1964, it gained its influence on government and gained autonomous status the same year. Since its establishment, the PIDE has been an influential voice in the formation of Pakistan's public policy concerning diverse issues.  The institute has long been a place of scholarship of high-profile,  prominent individuals who previously held positions in government, including Benazir Bhutto, Mahbub-ul-Haq, Robert Mundell (a Nobel Laureate who serves on our Advisory Committee) and Shahid Allam— all PIDE fellows.

Since the 1990s, its research has been devoted to theoretical and empirical research in development economics in general and on Pakistan-related economic issues in particular. In addition, the PIDE also grants post-graduate and doctoral degrees in various disciplines of social sciences since 2006.

Department of Economics and Econometrics 
In the early 2000s, the then director, A. R. Kemal started PhD programme in economics. The programme offers a wide range of optional areas within the subject, particular areas of economics in greater depth, from both a theoretical and an empirical perspective. The Department of Economics  consists of senior faculty members.

The teaching curriculum focuses on developing the role and application of economic approaches for environmental issues, essential features of the market mechanism to control environmental degradation for sustainable economic development, the nature and treatment of environmental effects in economic reasoning and decision-making, and the application of environmental policy instruments based on economic analysis. The course work is based on contemporary environmental management approaches (e.g. ecological modernization, ecological economics, and industrial ecology) with substantial (physical) economy dimensions.

Keeping in view the current lack of awareness and knowledge of Environmental issues, the MS Environmental Economics Programme is designed to:
 Impart a sound understanding of the nexus between the economy and the environment;
 Teach major concepts and theories to explain and describe the economic behaviour of human beings and its impact on the environment.
 Outline and contrast the major economic schools of thought on the environment, and highlight the weaknesses of each market system (especially with regard to environmental aspects) and discuss the associated role of the government in the economy.
 Supply high quality personnel to the federal and provincial governments, to educational institutions, to research institutions and to the private sector.

The Department also offers the MSc degree  in Econometrics and Statistics. These  include basic econometric theory, applied econometrics, probability theory,  statistical methods, sampling, time series analysis, financial econometrics,  and micro econometrics. The programme also prepares students for  admission to the PhD programme.

Department of Business Studies
Department of Business Studies currently offer MBA, M.Phil. in Business Economics, Economics and Finance and MS in Management Sciences Programs approved by HEC. Hafsa Hina is head of department.

Department of Population Sciences
The Department offers the Master in Population Sciences (MPS)  degree programme. The students are encouraged to have an in-depth  understanding of the complexities of population processes, including  fertility, family planning, morbidity, mortality, migration, urbanisation,  demographic dividend, family formation, and the relationships between  such processes and broader social and economic contexts and trends.  This multidisciplinary programme, while maintaining its core of basic  demographic features, includes new areas such as reproductive health,  HIV/AIDS, and current aspects of traditional population topics such as  aging, adolescence, gender, and the environment. The relationships and  differentials  between  many  aspects  of  population,  such  as  health,  education,  fertility,  mortality,  economics  of  household  structure,  economic  development,  and  population  growth,  poverty,  status  of  women, and development, are the main focus.

Organisational structure

Institutional offices
The Vice-Chancellor of the Pakistan Institute of Development  Economics  is  the  executive  head  of  the  Institute  and  heads  the  Syndicate, while the Deputy Chairman of the Planning Commission is  the Chancellor. The overseeing body of the Institute is the Senate of  PIDE; its membership is gained through both nomination and election.  The President of Pakistan is the Patron of PIDE.

In view of PIDE's current status as a degree-awarding academic  institution, the many administrative and cadre changes necessary for the  purpose can be foreseen. As such, other governing bodies are being formed  to cope with the future needs of PIDE's various component units.

Apart  from  the  teaching  Departments,  the  main  Divisions  at  PIDE  consist  of  Research,  Publications,  Training,  Library,  and  Computer  services.  Besides  the  Human  Resource  Development  Division, headed by the Registrar, the staff generally consists of Chief  of Research, Senior Research Economist, Research Economist, Staff  Economist, and Visiting Fellow. Equivalent posts exist in other fields.  Additionally, each professional Division is headed by the respective Chief of the Division.

In light of PIDE's recently expanded educational role, the teaching  faculties at the Institute are among its main focal developments.

Directors, joint directors and vice-chancellors
Source:
Gustav Ranis (1959–60)
Emile Despres (1960–64)
Irving Brecher (1961–62)
Henry Bruton (1962–63)
Mark Leiserson (1963–64)
Nurul Islam (1964–71)
 Taufique M. Khan (1965–70)
 S. M. Naseem (1972) (acting director)
 M. L. Qureshi (1972–79)
 Sultan Hashmi (1977–79)
 Durr-e-Nayab Director Research & Joint Director (1990 - Date)
Syed Nawab Haider Naqvi (1979–93; 1993–95)
 Sarfraz Khan Qureshi (1993; 1995–99
 M Ghaffar Chaudhry (1964 -2002; 1993 - 2002)
 A. R. Kemal (1999–2006)
 Nadeem Ul Haque (2006–7) (Vice Chancellor)
 Naushin Mahmood (2007) (acting vice chancellor)
 Rashid Amjad (2007–2013)
 Asad Zaman (2013– 2019)
 Dr. Nadeem Ul Haque (2019–Present)

International advisory board
At the beginning, three well-known economists, Max  F. Millikan, Gunner Myrdal (Nobel Laureate), and E. A. G. Robinson formed the Institute's International Advisory Board.  Following  registration  with  the  Government  of  Pakistan  as  an  autonomous organisation and the transfer of management to Pakistanis,  the International Advisory Board extended its membership to seven  outstanding  and  famous  economists,  namely,  Hollis  B.  Chenery,  Ansley J. Coale, Just Faaland, Harry G. Johnson, Gustav Ranis, and Paul P. Streeten. Currently, there are ten well-known economists from  all over the world who are  members of the International Advisory  Board. They are Gamani Corea, Just Faaland, Albert O. Hirschman, Lawrence  R.  Klein  (Nobel  Laureate),  Janos  Kornai,  E.  Malinvaud,  Robert A. Mundell (Nobel Laureate), Gustav Ranis, Paul P. Streeten, and Winfried von Urff.

Finances
PIDE is mainly funded by the Government of Pakistan, and partly  through  earnings from its  endowment  and  the studies  carried  out for  various  international  organisations.  The  Institute  has  always  enjoyed  generous patronage and support. H.R.H. The Aga Khan III had provided  the seed money for the Institute's founding in the late 1950s. The Ford  Foundation has also been contributing funds. In 1979, USAID provided a  substantial  endowment  grant.  The  United  Bank  Limited,  Industrial  Development  Bank  of  Pakistan,  Pak-Kuwait  Investment  Company  Limited,  Pak-Libya  Holding  Company  Limited,  and  Investment  Corporation of Pakistan have provided additional financial resources.

Research divisions
PIDE has been restructured around two main research themes  and six sub-themes. It has now two Departments underlining research  themes for the year 2006-2007 and six Divisions for sub-themes. The  Institute has been restructured as follows:

 Institutions,  Growth,  and  Macroeconomics  Department, which includes the following three Divisions:
 one point one Development Strategies and Governance;
 one point two Human Capital, Innovation, and Growth; and
 one point three Macroeconomics, Banking and Finance.
   Markets and Society Department, which includes the following three Divisions:
 Two point one Industrial Organisation, Markets, and Regulation;
 Two point two Agricultural Production, Markets, and Institutions; and
 Two point three Population and Social Dynamics.

Collaborative research
A  number  of  studies  have  been  completed  at  PIDE  in  collaboration with various international organisations, including the  World Bank, Committee for International Cooperation on Research in  Demography  (CICRED),  Asian  Development  Bank  (ADB), International Labour Organisation (ILO), the United Nations Fund for  Population  Activities  (UNFPA),  United  Nations  Children's  Fund  (UNICEF), World Bank Institute (WBI), Asian Development Bank  Institute  (ADBI),  World  Economic  Forum,  United  Nations  Educational,  Scientific,  and  Cultural  Organisation  (UNESCO),  Economic  and  Social  Commission  for  Asia  and  Pacific  (ESCAP),  United  Nations  Institute  for  Training  and  Research  (UNITAR),  ILO/ARTEP,  Asian  and  Pacific  Development  Centre  (APDC),  International  Food  Policy  Research  Institute  (IFPRI),  Erasmus University  (Rotterdam),  Institute  of  Social  Studies  (The  Hague),  Friedrich  Ebert  Stiftung  (FES),  Germany,  Food  and  Agriculture  Organisation of the UN (FAO), University of Tübingen, Germany, International  Centre  for  Economic  Growth,  USA,  International  Development Research Centre (IDRC) Canada, etc.

The studies conducted under these arrangements include topics such  as  the  Structure  of  Protection  and  Allocative  Efficiency  in  Pakistan,  Population,  Labour  Force  and  Migration,  Employment  Projections, Population of Pakistan, Wheat Market in Pakistan, Human Resource Development, Capital Flows and Economic Adjustment in  the Developing Countries, Sustainable Development in Pakistan (with a  focus  on  the  conservation  and  pollution  issues),  Household  Food  Security  in  Pakistan,  the  Ration  Shop  System,  Food  Outlook  and Security in Pakistan, anthropological studies in the areas of Women's Activities  and  Social  Status,  Natural  Resource  Management, Traditional Wisdom and Change, Ethnic Antagonism, Informal Sector  in the Rural and Urban Areas, and Land Transport and Communication  Linkages in the SAARC Region.

Two recent studies completed in collaboration with the United  Nations Funds for Population Activities and UNICEF are the “Census  Data Analysis”  and “National Nutrition Survey 2001-02”. Currently,  the second round of the poverty assessment project (PRHS-2) is under  way, in collaboration with the World Bank. “Interim Evaluation of the  Rural Support Programme in Pakistan”  is being undertaken in nine  districts of Pakistan in collaboration with the World Bank, Pakistan  Poverty  Alleviation  Fund,  National  Rural  Support  Programme,  and  Punjab Rural Support Programme.   PIDE, in collaboration with the  International Development Research Centre (IDRC), Canada, has also  worked on a project on “Community-based Monitoring System”.

SANEI
SANEI is a regional initiative to foster networking and collaboration  among economic research institutes in South Asia. Initiated in June 1998,  SANEI seeks to establish strong research inter-linkages among various  economic research institutes in the region with a view to encouraging a  better-informed policy-making process. As such, special emphasis is given  to capacity building and formation of a South Asia-wide professional  network of researchers engaged in policy-oriented studies.

SANEI organises annual research competitions within the South Asian region. Collaborative research has received strong support. This  implies that in addition to stand-alone research, SANEI funds projects  which are jointly carried out by at least two research institutes based in  two  different countries in  South  Asia. Studies carried  out under the  auspices of SANEI are published.  SANEI also holds annual conferences  as  part  of  its  effort  to  promote  an  exchange  of  ideas  on  economic  research in the region, as well as to disseminate its research findings.

The activities of the participating institutes are integrated and coordinated by the respective regional/country network. Until recently,  SANEI was housed in the Indian Council for Research on International  Economic  Relations,  New  Delhi,  India.  The  headquarters  of  the  organisation moved to Pakistan a couple of years ago. The Pakistan  Institute of Development Economics (PIDE) is the current Coordinator  for the South Asia Network.

A  Research  Advisory  Panel  (RAP),  comprising  renowned  economists from South Asia, evaluates research proposals submitted by  the  network  of  institutions.  The  Panel  reviews  the  progress  of  the  projects and provides expert guidance, with the objective to improve  the quality of research.

A constitution, “SANEI, Pakistan”, has been adopted and the body  has  been  registered  as  a  Society,  with  T.  N.  Srinivasan  as  its  Chairman and Nadeem Ul Haque as its Secretary (Coordinator). Funds  for research at SANEI are provided by the Global Development Network.

Publications and research information
Through  its  publications  and  research  information  services,  PIDE  disseminates  its  research  results  country/worldwide.  The  Publications Division is responsible for all publishing undertaken by PIDE  in  the  form  of  journals,  books,  newsletters,  research  reports,  and  monographs  as  well  as  miscellaneous  publications  for  the  academic  programmes, the programmes of the PSDE, PIDE Seminar Series, and the  training courses.

A number of joint publishing and production projects have also  been  completed  in  collaboration  with  other  research  organisations,  notably the Friedrich Ebert Stiftung, Islamabad, the Indian Council for  Research on International Economic Relations, New Delhi, the East-West Centre, Honolulu, the International Centre for Economic Growth,  San  Francisco,  the  Centre  for  Development  Planning,  Erasmus University,  Rotterdam,  National  Institute  of  Banking  and  Finance, Pakistan, the State Bank of Pakistan, the United Nations Population Fund, International Labour Organisation, and the United Nations Development Programme.

The Pakistan Development Review
Started at The Institute of Development Economics as Economic  Digest  in  1956,  The  Pakistan  Development  Review  (PDR) has  been  published by the Institute regularly since 1961, with only a short pause  during  1971-72.  For  several  decades  now,  it  has  been  a  refereed  international  journal  of  Economics  and  related  social  sciences.  Redesigned and re-planned twice in the last two decade, the contents  have tended to emphasise theoretical-cum-empirical contributions; the  underlying commitment has been to strengthen the interest in the general  areas of Economics and other social science fields. The journal is issued  quarterly  and,  with  a  fair  mix  of  topics,  regularly  contains  original  (theoretical and empirical) contributions to Economics, in general, and on  Pakistan's socio-economic problems, in particular. Nearly every issue  carries contributions by scholars from Pakistan and overseas. Currently,  the following editors work regularly on the PDR: Rashid Amjad  (Editor), Aurangzeb A. Hashmi (Literary Editor), and Mir  Annice Mahmood (Book Review Editor).

The  Review's  Editorial  Board  consists  of  thirty-five outstanding scholars in the field of Economics and various social  science  fields.  They  actively  participate  in  refereeing  the  papers submitted to the Review for publication; they also render valuable  advice on other related matters.

Most national and international indexing and abstracting services in the social sciences provide useful information about our publications. The contents of the PDR are abstracted/indexed regularly by several works of reference including International Bibliography of the Social Sciences, EconLit, e-JEL, JEL on CD, World Agricultural Economics and Rural Sociology Abstracts, Agricultural Engineering Abstracts, Asian-Pacific Economic Literature, Ekistic Index of Periodicals, Wheat, Barley and Triticale Abstracts, Tropical Oilseeds, Rice Abstracts, Population Index, International Labour Documentation, Bibliography of Asian Studies, Geo Abstracts, CABi, IORR Virtual Library, and Current Issues.

Occasionally, the PDR publishes special issues. For example, the Summer 1979 issue was devoted to a symposium on ‘Shadow Pricing’, while the Summer, Autumn, and Winter issues of 1980 were devoted to a symposium on ‘The State of Development Economics: Models and Realities’. More recent issues have carried current debates on social sciences research and the profession, while the Spring 2006 issue offers substantial focus on ‘Pakistan’s Growth Strategy’. The journal's large subscriber list includes universities, libraries, and individual addresses in all parts of the world. Electronic access has been made possible by placing nearly all of the information about publications on the PIDE website.

Research reports and monographs
These series of publications by the PIDE go a long way back. More than 200 research reports and 20 monographs (including those written before the separation of East and West Pakistan) have been published. The first monograph was researched and written by John C. H. Fei and Gustav Ranis, titled A Study of Planning Methodology with special reference to Pakistan's Second Five Year Plan. A complete list of the Research Reports and Monographs is available on the PIDE website.

PIDE working papers
This series, based on the seminars presented at PIDE, has
become vibrant and replaced the older Research Report series. Some
recent titles are:
 Dynamic Effects of Agriculture Trade in the Context of Domestic and Global Liberalisation: A CGE Analysis for Pakistan by Rizwana Siddiqui (2007).
 Measures of Monetary Policy Stance: The Case of Pakistan by Sajawal Khan and Abdul Qayyum (2007).
 Public Provision of Education and Government Spending in Pakistan by Muhammad Akram and Faheem Jehangir Khan(2007).
 Household Budget Analysis for Pakistan under Varying the Parameter Approach by Eatzaz Ahmad and Muhammad Arshad (2007).
 Pension and Social Security Schemes in Pakistan: Some Policy Options by Naushin Mahmood and Zafar Mueen Nasir(2008).
 Public Social Services, and Capability Development: A Cross-district Analysis of Pakistan by Rizwana Siddiqui (2008).
 Monetary Policy Transparency in Pakistan: An Independent Analysis by Wasim Shahid Malik and Musleh-ud Din (2008).
 Bilateral J-Curves between Pakistan and Her Trading Partners by Zehra Aftab and Sajawal Khan (2008).
 On Measuring the Complexity of Urban Living by Lubna Hasan (2008).

Books
PIDE is also a publisher of influential books. The first title, Investment of Oil Revenues, by M. L. Qureshi, was published in 1974, when the topic was just beginning to gain attention. A recent book, Gender and Empowerment: Evidence from Pakistan, by Rehana Siddiqui, et al. (2006), addresses current concerns. In the ‘Lectures’ series, two recent titles are: Beyond Planning and Mercantilism: An Evaluation of Pakistan's Growth Strategy by Nadeem Ul Haque (2006) and Brain Drain or Human Capital Flight by Nadeem Ul Haque (2005). Some of the well-known books published by PIDE earlier are:
 The Population of Pakistan by M. Afzal, et al. (1974)
 An Analysis of Real Wages in the Government Sector, 1971–76 by Syed Nawab Haider Naqvi (1977)
 An Agenda for Islamic Economic Reform by Syed Nawab Haider Naqvi (1980, reprinted in 1989)
 The PIDE Macro-econometric Model of Pakistan's Economy(Vol 1) by Syed Nawab Haider Naqvi, A. H. Khan, Nasir M. Khilji and Ather M. Ahmed (1983)
 Pakistan's Economy through the Seventies by Syed Nawab Haider Naqvi and Khwaja Sarmad (1984)
 Land Reforms in Pakistan: A Historical Perspective by Syed Nawab Haider Naqvi, Mahmood Hasan Khan, and M. Ghaffar Chaudhry (1987)
 Agricultural Growth and Employment by John W. Mellor (1988)
 Population and Development by Ansley J. Coale (1990)
 Pakistan's Economic Situation and Future Prospects by Ejaz Ahmed Naik (1993)
 Poverty and Rural Credit: The Case of Pakistan by Sohail J.Malik (1999)
 Public Sector Efficiency: Perspectives on Civil Service Reform by Nadeem Ul Haque and Musleh-ud Din (2006)
 Cities—Engines of Growth by Nadeem Ul Haque and Durr-e-Nayab (2007)
 Energy Issues in Pakistan by Mir Annice Mahmood (2008)
 PIDE Research in Print 1957–2007 by Zafar Javed Naqvi(2008)
 PIDE—from a Think Tank to a University: A Brief History by S.M. Naseem (2008)
 PIDE's Contribution to Development Thinking: The Earlier Phase by A. R. Khan (2008)

Other publications
Apart from the regular series of publications, PIDE also publishes occasionally Project Reports, Statistical Papers, essays, and lectures. PIDE Tidings ceased awhile ago. A bimonthly newsletter, PIDE Focus, now puts everyone in touch with PIDE's activities. PIDE Policy Viewpoint is also a new series drawing and inviting sufficient attention and contributions. Details about publications can be viewed at the PIDE website.

Fostering information exchange
PIDE conducts a variety of programmes and activities designed to support dialogue and information exchange among researchers, practitioners, and policy makers. It includes the Annual General Meeting and Conference of the Pakistan Society of Development Economists (PSDE), lectures, conferences, workshops, and seminars.

Annual general meeting and conference of the PSDE
Pakistan Society of Development Economists (PSDE), established in 1982 under the Societies Registration Act of 1860, provides an institutional framework for the dissemination of the fruits of research among scholars, public officials, and policy-makers dealing with economic matters. The Society's current membership of more than four hundred includes Nobel Laureates, academics, administrators, and other members working in all the different continents of the world.

The Society holds its annual meetings regularly. The Annual General Meeting and Conference of the Society is an occasion for stock-taking of the work done at PIDE and elsewhere on various socioeconomic problems of Pakistan, the region, and the world, as well as for suggesting new initiatives for further research. These meetings provide for the much-needed communication amongst the economics professionals, policy-makers, and various schools of interested observers of the ongoing debate concerning development-related issues. Twenty one such meetings have been held thus far, with over 600 papers presented in areas such as agriculture, industry, international trade and exchange rates, fiscal and monetary economics, project appraisals, demography, human resource development, resource mobilisation, debt, governance, gender, poverty, structural adjustment, and Islamic economics. The papers presented in the meetings are subsequently published in the Papers and Proceedings issue of The Pakistan Development Review.

The highlights of the PSDE meetings are the Distinguished Lectures. Three of these are Memorial Lectures dedicated to the memory of the Quaid-i-Azam, Mohammad Ali Jinnah, the founder of Pakistan, Mohammad Iqbal, poet-philosopher, and Mahbub ul Haq, economist. The Distinguished Speaker list in different years has had on it such names as Lawrence R. Klein (Nobel Laureate), Sir Hans W. Singer, E. Malinvaud, Paul P. Streeten, Ansley J. Coale, David P. Laidler, Robert

Lecture series
A lecture series, entitled “Lectures in Development Economics”, was instituted many years ago. Twenty-three lectures in this series have been delivered so far; eminent economists, demographers, and other social scientists have been on the speakers’ list. Many of these lectures have already been published by PIDE. Another seminar series on public policy issues was initiated in June 2002, which analysed the current policy issues. The new PIDE Lectures Series attracts major new contributions to various fields.

Conferences and workshops
A new series of conferences and workshops has been launched at PIDE for discussion and exchange of information. The main objective of the round-table conferences based on the new themes introduced at PIDE is to provide a forum for discussion to identify research issues in the area that the Institute and other researchers may follow. The objective of the workshops is to share findings of the studies on current issues in Pakistan. The proceedings of these conferences and workshops are available at PIDE's website.

PIDE Viewpoint—Seminar Series
The Pakistan Institute of Development Economics initiated in 2006 a weekly seminar series to stimulate intellectual thought for development discourse. A similar PIDE Viewpoint—Seminar Series has been in place since early 2008. The seminars are open to policymakers, researchers, planners, practitioners, educators, individuals from the public and private organisations, and students. The series covers a variety of subjects and issues in the field of economics and other social sciences.

Training and Project Evaluation Division
The Training and Project Evaluation Division conducts specialised in-service training courses in Economic Planning and Management for development practitioners working in government or semi-government departments and in autonomous development organisations. The objective is to develop the operational skills of the participants so that they can successfully plan and assess all aspects of development projects. It covers all sectors of the economy such as agriculture, industry, livestock, water, power, transport, education, and health.

Participants learn modern techniques to carry out financial, economic, and social evaluations of projects, as well as the methods for planning and implementing projects. The specified courses include Project Planning, Appraisal, Implementation, and Evaluation Techniques, Effective Communications Skills, Gender Mainstreaming, Macroeconomic Planning and Management, and Result-based Monitoring and Evaluation. Learning theory is combined with practical exercises, including monitoring of ongoing field activities. Training also involves lively group discussions and presentations of projects by the participants.

The Division has added policy analysis courses in its programme since 1998. As PIDE is one of the institutes designated by the Government of Pakistan for promotion-related capacity building of civil servants of various occupational groups (BPS-17 and above), the number of courses to be administered at this campus has been increasing. The Division has broad links and information-sharing channels with other national and international training institutes. Besides training, the Division also contributes to research and development activities of PIDE through its projects and programmes.

References

External links
Official website

Political and economic think tanks based in Pakistan
Educational institutions established in 1957
Public universities and colleges in Pakistan
Ministry of Planning and Development
Universities and colleges in Islamabad
Islamabad Capital Territory
1957 establishments in Pakistan